The Echoes were a vocal trio from Brooklyn, most famous for their 1961 hit single "Baby Blue". The group was composed of Tommy Duffy, Harry Boyle, and Tom Morrissey. The three had been members of the Laurels.

The Echoes' first single, "Baby Blue", was a major hit, reaching No. 12 on the Billboard Hot 100. The Echoes continued to release singles through 1965, but none experienced the same level of success. After changes, the group would be re-branded as The Scoundrels.

Morrissey would later go on to be chairman of the Arizona Republican Party.

Discography

References

American pop music groups
Doo-wop groups
Smash Records artists
Vocal trios
Musical groups from Brooklyn
Musical groups established in 1960
1960 establishments in New York City
American musical trios